Magnolia pallescens is a species of Magnolia from  the Dominican Republic.

References

External links
 
 

pallescens
Endemic flora of the Dominican Republic